The canton of Saint-Georges-de-Mons is an administrative division of the Puy-de-Dôme department, central France. It was created at the French canton reorganisation which came into effect in March 2015. Its seat is in Saint-Georges-de-Mons.

It consists of the following communes:
 
Les Ancizes-Comps
Beauregard-Vendon
Blot-l'Église
Champs
Charbonnières-les-Vieilles
Combronde
Davayat
Gimeaux
Jozerand
Lisseuil
Loubeyrat
Manzat
Marcillat
Montcel
Pouzol
Prompsat
Queuille
Saint-Angel
Saint-Gal-sur-Sioule
Saint-Georges-de-Mons
Saint-Hilaire-la-Croix
Saint-Myon
Saint-Pardoux
Saint-Quintin-sur-Sioule
Saint-Rémy-de-Blot
Teilhède
Vitrac
Yssac-la-Tourette

References

Cantons of Puy-de-Dôme